Stacy M. Hardy is a writer, journalist, multimedia artist and theatre practitioner.
She is a founding member of the Venus Fly Trapeze Theatre Company, which has produced 8 original productions since 1995. She has lectured and tutored in the Drama Department at Rhodes University (1996–98) and remains active in using theatre as an educational tool by lecturing and hosting workshops for the Grahamstown Foundation's National Schools Festival (1996–2003). She is currently scripting a new play for acclaimed South African director Jaco Bouwer.

She has six years' experience as a freelance journalist, commissioning editor and features writer for publications including SL magazine, Rage.co.za and Art South Africa, and 5-year's experience in advertising. Her work on Keyline Magazine received a Silver Loerie 2001. In 2001, together with Peet Pienaar and Heidi Chisholm, she established the advertising and design company Daddy Buy Me A Pony.

Her digital and multimedia art has been exhibited at various local and international exhibitions and she was a member of the South African delegation at Ars Electronica in Austria in 2002. She has won numerous awards, including a Construction Award 2003 and New Channels Digital Art Competition 2003. Her currently digital projects include a new collaboration with Francois Naude on a work that explores translation and literacy in South Africa.

Her fiction has appeared on "Donga", Litnet, in the Laugh It Off Annual, "Chimurenga" and in AFRO Magazine. She participated in the 2003 Crossing Border Festival in Den Hagen, Netherlands, with fellow South African authors Ivan Vladislavic, Lesego Rampolokeng, Phaswane Mpe, K. Sello Duiker, and Nadine Botha. She has completed fiction for a book of photography by Pieter Hugo, published in 2007 and has collaborated with Miles Keylock, Adam Haupt and Julian Jonker on a book of South African lyrics.

Works

Her short film, I Love You Jet Li, created in collaboration with Jaco Bouwer was part of the transmediale.06: video selection, International Film Festival Rotterdam (IFFR) 2006 selection and was awarded Best Experimental Film at the Festival Chileno Internacional Del Cortometraje De Santiago in 2006.

She is currently working as a writer and educator for the CAPE Africa Platform. She is also a member of the Bowling Club, a new collaborative creative venture founded by artist and designer Peet Pienaar. She regularly contributes to various conferences and platforms, including recent Underground Conference organised by Fred Devries at the Wits Institute for Social and Economic Research and the VANSA (The Visual Arts Network of SA) Young Curators Workshop held on Robben Island.

Notes

References
  Essay by Stacy Hardy on Pieter Hugo's publication
 On Chimurenga magazine
 Official Biography
 Interdisciplines.org

External links
Stacy Hardy speaking at africa digital remix
I Love you jet li article 
Pilgrimages website
Publishing house of I Love you Jet Li

South African women writers
South African artists
Living people
South African journalists
South African dramatists and playwrights
Women dramatists and playwrights
Year of birth missing (living people)